Sigma Nu is an undergraduate college fraternity founded at the Virginia Military Institute on January 1, 1869. The fraternity was founded by James Frank Hopkins, Greenfield Quarles and James McIlvaine Riley shortly after Hopkins witnessed what he considered a hazing ritual by upperclassmen at the Virginia Military Institute. The fraternity's existence remained secret until the founders publicly announced their new society on January 1, 1869. Since its founding, Sigma Nu has amassed more than 279 active and inactive chapters and colonies across the United States and Canada and has initiated more than 227,000 members. Sigma Nu, Kappa Alpha Order and Alpha Tau Omega make up the Lexington Triad.

The fraternity's values are summarized as an adherence to the principles of love, honor, and truth. Because of its military heritage, Sigma Nu retains many military trappings in its chapter ranks and traditions, and places importance on the concept of personal honor. In 1945, William Yates (University of Pennsylvania) inspired the formation of the "Sigma Nu Inc., Educational Foundation". Its name was changed to the "Sigma Nu Educational Foundation, Inc." The foundation assists collegiate members with financial aid supplements, and the fraternity in the development of a leadership program.
The fraternity's mission statement is:
 To develop ethical leaders inspired by the principles of Love, Honor and Truth.
 To foster the personal growth of each man's mind, heart and character.
 To perpetuate lifelong friendships and commitment to the Fraternity.

History

James Frank Hopkins, Greenfield Quarles, and James McIlvaine Riley enrolled at the Virginia Military Institute in 1866. Hopkins entered the institute at the age of 21 and was, at the time, one of the oldest cadets entering the institute. Both Hopkins and Quarles had served in the American Civil War as Confederate soldiers.

At this time, many secret societies were being formed on the VMI campus. In Hopkins' third year at VMI, he joined the Masonic Lodge in Lexington. The masons inspired him to create a similar organization at VMI. Hopkins shared his ideas with Quarles and Riley, and in October 1868, the three came together on a limestone rock on the edge of the VMI parade ground to form the Legion of Honor. The three founders would go on to bring others into the Legion of Honor over the rest of the year. On January 1, 1869, the founders, along with the rest of the members of the Legion of Honor, held their first official meeting as Sigma Nu.

The first year of Sigma Nu also saw the creation of the Badge, the original Constitution, and the Law. The Badge designed by Hopkins stands mostly unchanged from its original form. The badges were first introduced in the spring of 1869.  Early members, Edward Arthur and Linton Buck, both wrote the original Constitution and Law, respectively. Some conflict arose because  Arthur had been a member of the Honduras Emigrant Society and had included some influences from that organization in the constitution. Linton Buck felt these influences should be removed. His revision became the first Law of Sigma Nu. This first chapter of Sigma Nu chose as its motto nulli secundus, a Latin phrase meaning "second to none."

There were many efforts in the beginning years to establish chapters at other schools. By 1883, Alpha chapter attempted to establish 11 additional chapters, of which only 3 survived. One of the many factors was the anti-fraternity sentiment during this time period. Kappa chapter established in 1881, at North Georgia College & State University, gave the fraternity an important member, John Alexander Howard. Howard suggested that the fraternity drop the use of Roman numerals for chapter designation in favor of using a Greek letter designation. He is also responsible for the creation of The Delta, Sigma Nu's fraternity magazine. The name The Delta originated from the location of the three active chapters of Sigma Nu forming a Delta. Howard's editorials in The Delta inspired Isaac P. Robison, founder of Lambda chapter, to propose having a convention for the whole fraternity. On July 10, 1884, Sigma Nu's first convention was held in the Maxwell House Hotel in Nashville, Tennessee.

In 1909, Sigma Nu was a founding member of the North American Interfraternity Conference, an organization of 57 men's college fraternities.

The first national headquarters for the fraternity was established in Indianapolis in 1915. It relocated to Lexington, Virginia in 1958. Additional wings were constructed in 1969 and 1994, on the occasion of Sigma Nu's 100th and 125th anniversaries.

Governance structure

Grand Chapter
The Grand Chapter of Sigma Nu is a four-day legislative convention where representatives of the fraternity's collegiate and alumni chapters and Grand Officers meet to determine new legislation and operational direction of the Fraternity for the next biennium. The Grand Chapter meets every two years. The Grand Chapter body is composed of two voting representatives from each collegiate chapter of Sigma Nu Fraternity. Laws are discussed and voted on by the collegiate representatives in a Robert's Rules of Order style business meeting conducted by the National Regent of the Fraternity.

The Law of Sigma Nu Fraternity, Inc.
The Law is a three-part document (Constitution, Statutes and Trial Code), which governs Sigma Nu Fraternity, Inc. The Law sets membership requirements, standards of conduct, and the framework for the operation of all entities of the Fraternity, including collegiate chapters. The Law is designed to allow for autonomy and self-governance in collegiate chapters. The Law may be amended by the Grand Chapter to accommodate changing needs of Sigma Nu's membership. The first edition of the Law was formally adopted at Sigma Nu's first convention in 1884.

High Council
The High Council serves as the board of directors of Sigma Nu Fraternity, Inc. and is elected by the Grand Chapter. It serves as the governing arm of the General Fraternity during the period between Grand Chapters. Governance of the High Council is relegated to those duties especially prescribed by The Law. In cases where The Law prescribes no especial duty, the High Council shall act on those situations through interpretation of The Law. There are five roles on the High Council: the Regent, who acts as the national president and chairman of the board of Sigma Nu for a term of two years; the Regent-Elect, who ascends to the role of Regent at the end of the prior Regent's term; the Grand Treasurer, who is responsible for the financial condition of the fraternity; the Vice-Regents, appointed members of the board; and the Collegiate Grand Councilmen, who serve as collegiate representatives to the High Council.

Chapters and Members 

Sigma Nu consists of 279 chapters and colonies in colleges and universities throughout the United States and Canada. Since the founding of Sigma Nu, over 230,000 members have been initiated.

Membership development

The fraternity sponsors various programming including ethical leadership development through its LEAD program and philanthropic events through its Helping Hand Initiative.  It recruits new members using its Values Based Recruitment method.

College of Chapters
The Sigma Nu College of Chapters is a three-day training program held annually. College of Chapters is designed for collegiate chapter Commanders, and the program emphasizes chapter management, leadership, core competencies, and networking. The curriculum focuses on best practices and is presented by fraternity staff, alumni volunteers, and advisers.

LEAD
The LEAD (Leadership, Ethics, Achievement, Development) Program is designed to be a four-year educational and development curriculum for its collegiate members. In 1988, Sigma Nu created the LEAD Program. Since its launch in 1988 the Program has been updated twice, once in 1997 and again in 2008. The 2008 updates included the online version of the LEAD Program that currently exists today. The program trains candidates in general life skills, with an emphasis on alcohol use disorder awareness.

Some notable controversies

The fraternity began debating allowing non-white and Jewish members shortly after the U.S. Supreme Court desegregated schools in 1954. In 1964, following a failed civil rights amendment to the Sigma Nu's constitution, the Dartmouth College chapter seceded from the fraternity in protest. The organization did not allow non-white members until the late 1960s. The Dartmouth chapter rejoined in 1983.

Following graduation in 1989, actor Jon Hamm enrolled at the University of Texas, where he was a member of the Upsilon Chapter of Sigma Nu fraternity. While Hamm was attending the school he was arrested for participating in a violent hazing incident that occurred in November 1990 in which another student, Mark Sanders, was beaten with a paddle and a broom, where Hamm was leading Sanders around the fraternity house with the claw of a hammer beneath Sander's genitals, and had his clothes set on fire. The incident led to the fraternity being shut down on campus. Hamm completed the terms of a deferred adjudication and the charges were dismissed in August 1995.

In 1985 Sigma Nu University of Idaho held an annual holiday stag party, where a stripper named "Six Gun Sally" was hired to entertain the underclassmen members.

In 2003 Sigma Nu lost its charter at Missouri State University for hazing pledges; however, it was later reinstated.

In 2004, nine members of Sigma Nu at Fresno State University were arrested on campus for kidnapping after playing a prank on their vice president. Other students witnessed the prank and thought it was a real abduction, calling the police. 

In 2010, a fraternity member at Arizona State University stabbed a fellow fraternity member when he tried to throw him into a pool.

In 2012, the fraternity at Southern Utah University was indefinitely suspended due to hazing, low academic achievement, low recruitment, and low financial resources.

In 2012, the fraternity at the University of Mississippi was suspended for repeated hazing violations.

In 2014, the fraternity at Emory University was suspended for five years for repeated hazing and misconduct violations.  One hazing incident required pledges to “consume food items in large quantities at rapid paces to the point of physical harm and vomiting".

In 2014, the fraternity at the University of Virginia lost its charter due to hazing pledges.

In February 2014, Sigma Nu suspended all chapter events at University of North Carolina Wilmington after a fight broke out at a party they hosted. An East Carolina University student attending their party drove with a US Marine on his hood and hit a tree, killing the Marine. He was arrested for DWI and felony death by vehicle.

In 2014, the fraternity at the University of Nebraska-Lincoln was suspended for fire code and housing violations.

In 2015, Sigma Nu suspended its chapter at Old Dominion University pending an investigation after they placed banners with slogans like "Rowdy and Fun, Hope Your Baby Girl is Ready for a Good Time..." and the story went viral. The national fraternity stated they condemned the derogatory and demeaning language used by the fraternity members in the banners.

In 2015, the fraternity at Middle Tennessee State University was suspended until 2019 due to hazing and alcohol violations.

In 2015, the fraternity at Miami University was suspended until 2018 for violating social probation. There were also allegations of forcing underage pledges to consume large amounts of alcohol and banning pledges from shaving and showering.

In 2015, the fraternity at Purdue University was suspended for two years for hazing pledges, illegal drug use, and alcohol consumption by minors.

In October 2015, during a party held at the Sigma Nu fraternity house at Penn State University, a 19-year-old college student from New York City (later identified as John Mateer) was assaulted by another party-goer after revealing that he was gay. Photographs of the incident were posted on Twitter and immediately gained widespread media attention. Mateer’s assailant was later identified by State College Police as 18-year-old Matthew Chandlee. State College Police also confirmed that while the crime took place at the Sigma Nu house, Chandlee himself was not a member of the fraternity. The case was most notable for starting a national conversation surrounding hate crime legislation, as Pennsylvania does not protect members of the LGBT community under their hate crime laws.

In February 2016, Sigma Nu suspended its chapter at the University of North Georgia due to allegations of hazing and alcohol abuse.

In August 2016, a Sigma Nu member at Texas A&M University died of an illegal drug overdose in the fraternity house. Six members were arrested for possession and distribution of illegal drugs on campus such as cocaine, meth, LSD, MDMA, marijuana, heroin, and ecstasy. In October 2017, the deceased member's father, Eugene Gridnev, instituted a wrongful death suit against the fraternity itself, as well as several of the members present during his son's death.

In October 2016, Sigma Nu suspended its chapter at University of Nevada, Reno when a freshman pledge fell down the stairs and died after a night of excessive drinking in the fraternity house.

In October 2017, Sigma Nu suspended its chapter at Indiana University Bloomington for alcohol and hazing-related violations. According to the Indiana Daily Student, Sigma Nu was on probation since 2016 and was the fourth IU social organization to be suspended during 2017, the other organizations being Delta Delta Delta and Sigma Gamma Rho sororities and the Delta Tau Delta fraternity.

In October 2021, the fraternity at University of Southern California was suspended following allegations of sexual assault against at least seven women.

Citations

References

External links
 Sigma Nu National Website
 The Digital Delta

 
Student organizations established in 1869
North American Interfraternity Conference
Student societies in the United States
Lexington triad
1869 establishments in Virginia